Saturnian Mist is a black metal band that formed in 2006 at Kuopio, Finland by vocalist fra. Zetekh and guitarist fra. Chaoswind. Lyrically the band draws their inspiration from Occult, Mysticism, Philosophy and Satanism.

Members

Current members

 fra. Zetekh – vocals
 fra. Chaoswind – guitar
 fra. Ptahaz – guitar (formerly bass)
 fra. Macabrum - bass guitar
 fra. Psychonaught – percussions
 fra. Vile - drums

Former members
 Desolate - bass guitar (2012–2013)
 Flamen - bass guitar (live) (2012-2012)
 A - drums (2008-2009 & 2012-2012)
 Shu-Ananda – guitar (2010–2012)
 Wyrmfang - Drums (2009-2011)
 Det - bass guitar (live) (2011-2011)
 Noxifer - Guitars, drums (2009-2010)

Discography

Studio albums
Shamatanic  (2021), Petrichor / Hammerheart Records
Chaos Magick (album) (2015), Candlelight Records 
Gnostikoi Ha-Shaitan (2011), Ahdistuksen Aihio Productions

EPs
Repellings (2009), Descending Towards Damnation

Splits
  Saturnian Mist / Creatura (2009), Monokrom Records

Music videos
 Bloodsoaked Chakrament (2015), Candlelight Records
The True Law (2014), Candlelight Records
 Aura Mystica (2011), Ahdistuksen Aihio Productions

Demos
Demonstrations MMXIII] (2013), self-produced
Promo 2010 (2010), self-produced
Saturnian Mist (2008), Drakkar Productions

References

External links

Finnish black metal musical groups
Musical groups established in 2006
Candlelight Records artists